The 2004 Washington Huskies football team was an American football team that represented the University of Washington during the 2004 NCAA Division I-A football season.  In its second and final season under head coach Keith Gilbertson, the team compiled a 1–10 record, winless in the Pacific-10 Conference, and was outscored 334 to 154.

This was Washington's first losing season since 1976. Following lopsided road losses at USC and Oregon, Gilbertson announced on the first of November that he would step down at the end of the season. The Huskies lost the remaining three games; the final loss at Washington State was UW's first Apple Cup defeat in seven years. Washington's most recent one-victory season was in 1969.

Schedule

NFL Draft
Two Huskies were selected in the 2005 NFL Draft, which lasted seven rounds (255 selections).

References

Washington
Washington Huskies football seasons
Washington Huskies football